Darren John Langford (born 1 April 1984) is a British actor who is best known for playing the mentally disabled character Spencer Gray in the long-running Channel 4 soap opera Hollyoaks. Langford left Hollyoaks in late 2010.

References

Living people
1982 births
British male soap opera actors
People educated at Lostock High School